Cablevision is a cable television, and Internet service provider in Canada. The company predominantly serves the Abitibi-Témiscamingue area, though it serves other parts of Quebec as well. Cablevision's offices are in Val-d'Or, Quebec.

See also 
 List of internet service providers in Canada

External links
 

Canadian companies established in 1957
Cable and DBS companies of Canada
Internet service providers of Canada
Bell Aliant
Companies based in Quebec
Val-d'Or
1957 establishments in Quebec